Brian McMillan (16 January 1941 – 18 April 2011) was  a former Australian rules footballer who played with Richmond in the Victorian Football League (VFL).

Notes

External links 
		

1941 births
2011 deaths
Australian rules footballers from Victoria (Australia)
Richmond Football Club players
Castlemaine Football Club players